The Dendera light is a motif in the Hathor temple at Dendera in Egypt. It depicts the Egyptian creation myth, and the text surrounding the pieces confirm this.

The temple contains several reliefs depicting Harsomtus, in the form of a snake, emerging from a lotus flower which is usually attached to the bow of a barge. The so-called dendera light is a variation of this motif, showing Harsomtus in an oval container called hn, which might represent the womb of Nut.

Sometimes a djed pillar supports the snake or the container. A closely related motif is "god resting on the lotus flower".

Depictions and text 
Each of the three objects consists of two reliefs. One half (a) of each pair is in south crypt 1-C (crypte 4), the other half (b) in room G (chambre V) of the temple.

Similar motifs

Fringe interpretation
In contrast to the mainstream interpretation, a fringe theory proposes that the reliefs depict Ancient Egyptian technology, based on comparison to similar modern devices (such as a Cathode-ray tube, Geissler tubes, Crookes tubes, and arc lamps). Norman Lockyer's passing reference to a colleague's humorous suggestion that electric lamps would explain the absence of lampblack deposits in the tombs has sometimes been forwarded as an argument supporting this particular interpretation (another argument being made is the use of a system of reflective mirrors).

Proponents of this interpretation have also used a text stating that "high poles covered with copper plates were erected to break the storms coming from on high" to argue this, but Bolko Stern has written in detail explaining why the copper-covered tops of poles (which were lower than the associated pylons) do not relate to electricity or lightning, pointing out that no evidence of anything used to manipulate electricity had been found in Egypt and that this was a magical and not a technical installation.

Archaeologist and debunker Kenneth Feder argued that if ancient Egyptians really had such advanced technology, some light bulb remains (glass shards, metal sockets, filaments...) should have been discovered during archaeological excavations. By applying Occam's razor, he instead highlighted the feasibility of the aforementioned reflective mirrors system, and also that the notion of adding salt to torches to minimize lampblack was well known by ancient Egyptians.

See also 
 Egyptian mythology

References

Notes

Sources cited

External links

 
  
 
 
 

Egyptology
Pseudoarchaeology

el:Δένδερα#Ανάγλυφο στο ναό της Αθώρ